Swaffelen (or zwaffelen or dick-slap) is a Dutch term meaning to hit one's soft or semi-hard penis - often repeatedly - against an object or another person's body. Swaffelen was named as the word of the year in the Netherlands and Belgium in 2008.

The act of swaffelen often takes place in the form of teasing, crude humor, or a degrading context, but can also be a sexual act. When the act is practiced on a person, it is often the person's cheek that is hit with the flaccid or semi-hard penis.

Origin
The term "swaffelen" is believed to have originated in English-speaking areas. It is believed to originate from Dutch words meaning swing, sway and swoop, as well as the German words for tail or penis (Schweif and Schwanz).

Media-coverage
In April 2008, the term received wide media-attention in the Netherlands and Belgium, when a Dutch student committed the act on the Taj Mahal and uploaded the video to YouTube. The student was suspended for this action.

In response, the BNN TV program Spuiten en Slikken invited viewers to make their own videos of other objects being swaffeled. They also called for a BNN Nationale Swaffeldag (BNN National Swaffel Day) to be declared. The Royal Palace of Amsterdam and the Basilica of Saint Servatius in Maastricht were among the objects swaffeled in the submissions.

In 2015 a firefighter in Enkhuizen was fired for swaffeling a colleague.

When the topic of swearing in various languages arose, in episode 4, series N, of the British panel show QI, one of the show's panelists, Jeremy Clarkson, mentioned the word, defining it as meaning, specifically, "...to bang your penis against the Taj Mahal."

On episode 5 of the Amazon Video show The Grand Tour, Jeremy Clarkson again defined it as "to bang your gentleman sausage... on the side of the Taj Mahal".

Word of the year
Swaffelen was voted as the word of the year in a 2008 competition organized by Genootschap Onze Taal (Society for our Language),  (Van Dale Publishers) and the newspaper De Pers.  The blog GeenStijl.nl encouraged readers to vote for "swaffelen". "Swaffelen" received 57% of the votes while "wiiën" (meaning to play Wii) drew 12% and "bankendomino" (referring to the credit crisis) received 6% of the votes. "Gastroseksueel" and "smirten" each received 5% of the vote.

Turkey-slap
Turkey-slap is another term for swaffelen. The phrase gained notoriety in Australia during 2006, after two male contestants in the Big Brother reality TV series performed the act on a female housemate. In the ensuing controversy, the male housemates were expelled from the house and contest for violating the show's terms of agreement.

See also
 Erotic humiliation
 Teabagging

References

Dutch words and phrases
Sexual acts
Sexual slang
Human penis
Sexuality in the Netherlands